Roquefort-sur-Soulzon is a commune in the Aveyron department, in the region of Occitania, southern France.

Roquefort is located on the Causse du Larzac and is famous for its ewe derived products including milk, wool and meat. Much of the activity in the commune centres on the production and distribution of Roquefort cheese. To be legally termed Roquefort cheese, it must follow the rules laid down by the federal standards of the Appelation d’Origine. According to archaeologists, the cheese making process in the specific caves dates back to 900 C.E.

A visitor centre illustrates the process of making Roquefort cheese and offers guests a chance to sample and purchase the product.

Demographics

See also
Communes of the Aveyron department

References

External links

 Roquefort tourist office

Communes of Aveyron
Massif Central
Aveyron communes articles needing translation from French Wikipedia